This is a list of 18th-century British children's literature titles (ordered by year of publication):

 Divine Songs (1715) by Isaac Watts
 A Description of Three Hundred Animals (1730) by Thomas Boreman
 The Gigantick History of the Two Famous Giants (1730) by Thomas Boreman
 A Little Pretty Pocket-Book (1744) published by John Newbery
 The Governess, or The Little Female Academy (1749) by Sarah Fielding
 The History of Little Goody Two-Shoes (1765) published by John Newbery
 The Parables of Our Lord and Saviour Jesus Christ (1768) by Christopher Smart
 Hymns for the Amusement of Children (1771) by Christopher Smart
 Lessons for Children (1778–79) by Anna Laetitia Barbauld
 An Easy Introduction to the Knowledge of Nature (1780) by Sarah Trimmer
 Hymns in Prose for Children (1781) by Anna Laetitia Barbauld
 Sacred Dramas by Hannah More
 The Life and Perambulation of a Mouse (1783) by Dorothy Kilner
 Cobwebs to Catch Flies (1783) by Ellenor Fenn
 The History of Sandford and Merton (1783–89) by Thomas Day
 Anecdotes of a Boarding School (1784) by Dorothy Kilner
 The Female Guardian (1784) by Ellenor Fenn
 A Description of a Set of Prints of Scripture History (1786) by Sarah Trimmer
 Fabulous Histories (1786) by Sarah Trimmer
 The History of Little Jack (1788) by Thomas Day
 Original Stories from Real Life (1788) by Mary Wollstonecraft
 The Parent's Assistant (1796) by Maria Edgeworth
 Adventures of a Pincushion (1780–1783) by Mary Ann Kilner
 Evenings at Home (1794–98) by John Aikin and Anna Laetitia Barbauld
 Keeper’s Travels in Search of His Master (1798) by Edward Augustus Kendall
 The Rational Brutes (1799) by Dorothy Kilner
 Moral Tales for Young People (1801) by Maria Edgeworth
 Tommy Thumb's Pretty Song Book (1744) by Mary Cooper
 A Little Book for Little Children (1702) by Thomas White
 A Token for Children (1709) by James Janeway
 Winter-Evening Entertainments (1737) by Nathaniel Crouch
 The History of Fortunatus (1740) author unknown, translator Thomas Churchyard
 The Lilliputian magazine (1752) published by John Newbery

See also
 Books in the United Kingdom

 Titles
18th century-related lists
Lists of children's books
Child